Sunny Sauceda is a three-time Grammy-winning Tejano music artist from San Antonio, Texas. Sauceda plays the accordion and is known as the most energetic accordion player in the world. His accordion playing often overshadows his vocal prowess. Sauceda has a sultry but powerful modern voice.

As the front man for Grupo Vida, his stage presence influenced a decade of up and coming performers. He is the recipient of three GRAMMY Awards, among other honors.

Early life and career
Sauceda's career started as a childhood star in San Antonio, recording his first CD as a young boy at the age of 5. During a lifetime spent with music; first with his family then with successful groups and now as a solo artist, Sauceda's songwriting, recordings and performances have been enjoyed by fans around the world.

Sauceda was a member of Grupo Vida, which played as the opening act for the Dixie Chicks' national "Fly" tour. Sauceda later contributed to Charlie Robison's album Step Right Up.

In 2005, Sauceda won a Grammy Award for best Tejano CD, for his part in Polkas, Gritos y Acordeones. Shortly thereafter he signed with Tejas Records, and released a self-titled debut album in November 2005.He later signed with Solstice Records with his band Y Todo Eso

Sauceda has served on the boards of the chapter of the Texas GRAMMY chapter office as a Board of Governor, as a Vice-President and the Academy of Tejano music.

Discography

Awards

1983 Joey Discos Youngest Recording Artist in San Antonio
1996 Relevacion Del Ano *
1997 T.T.M.A Rising Group of the Year *
1998 T.T.M.A Accordion Player of the Year
1998 T.T.M.A Showband of the Year *
1999 T.E.M.A Accordion Player of the Year
1999 T.E.M.A Showband of the Year *
2004 T.T.M.A Showband of the Year *
2005 GRAMMY Nominated *
2005 T.T.M.A Showband of the Year *
2005 SXSW Tex Mex Band of the Year *
2005 Current Magazine Best Tejano/Conjunto Group *
2005 GRAMMY Award Winner (Best Tejano Album, Polkas, Gritos, y Accordeones)
2005 Tejano Academy Best Instrumental (DLG, Joel Guzman, Sunny)
2005 Latin GRAMMY Award Winner (Best Tejano Album, Polkas, Gritos, y Accordeones)
2006 T.T.M.A Album of the Year Conjunto Progressive Nomination
2006 T.T.M.A Most Promising Band Nomination
2006 T.T.M.A Male Entertainer of the Year Nomination
2006 T.T.M.A Song of the Year Nomination
2007 T.T.M.A Most Promising Band
2007 T.T.M.A Showband of the Year Nomination
2007 T.T.M.A Entertainer of the Year Nomination
2008 GRAMMY nominated (Vagar Libremente)
2008 T.T.M.A. Entertainer of the Year Nomination
2008 T.T.M.A. Crossover Song of the Year Nomination
2008 T.T.M.A. Showband of the Year Nomination
2008 T.T.M.A. Vocal Duo
 Tejano Music Awards of 2008 - Vocal Duo of the Year with Shelly Lares
2009 T.T.M.A Crossover Song of the year Nomination
2009 T.T.M.A Entertainer of the year Nomination
2010 T.T.M.A Male Vocalist of the Year Nomination
2009 GRAMMY nominated (Radiacion Musical)
2010 Latin GRAMMY nominated (Homenaje a Mi Padre)
2011 GRAMMY nominated (Homenaje a Mi Padre)
2011 Los Premios Texas Mejor Artista Texano Winner
2011 Latin GRAMMY nominated (Camaleon)

Notes

References
 mySA, Tejano star Sauceda stays strong, September 24, 2013
 Rutland Herald, Life after vida: Grammy nominee, Sunny Sauceda, mixes it up, February 13, 2008

External links
 Latin Grammy Awards
 Rancho Alegre Radio Interview, Sunny Sauceda, July 2011
 Past Tejano Music Award Winners
 River City Attractions Sunny Sauceda is a Musical Chameleon, May 23, 2011
 Houston Chronicle Blog, Sunny Sauceda Talks Grammys, State of Tejano, January 29, 2010

Tejano musicians
Musicians from San Antonio
American accordionists
Tejano accordionists
Living people
21st-century accordionists
Year of birth missing (living people)